Carl Henrik Boheman (10 July 1796 – 2 November 1868) was a Swedish entomologist.

Boheman studied at Lund University and trained as an officer, participating in the invasion of Norway in 1814. He had been an enthusiastic entomologist since childhood, and was called by the Royal Swedish Academy of Sciences in 1841 to the position of professor and keeper of the Department of Entomology of the Swedish Museum of Natural History in Stockholm. He had been made a member of the Academy in 1838. He retired from the Museum in 1867.

Boheman was a specialist in coleoptera, and particularly in Chrysomelidae and Rhynchophora, he collaborated in particular with Carl Johan Schönherr (1772–1848) in his great work on Curculionidae. His other works included Årsberättelse om framstegen I insekternas myria ach arachnidernas naturalhistoria under åren 1845 och 1846 (1847), Insecta Caffraria (two volumes, 1848–1857), Monographia Cassididarum Holmiæ (four volumes, 1850–1862) and the ninth part, devoted to Cassidinae, in Catalogue of coleopterous insects in the collection of the British Museum (1856). Boheman who wrote 49 important papers described many common species some from San Francisco, California taken on the 1851–1853 expedition voyage of the Eugenie Kongliga Svenska Fregatten Eugenies Resa Omring Jorden, Entomologiska Bidrag (1858–1859), as well as very many other North American Coleoptera.

His grandson was diplomat Erik Boheman and his great-grandson was actor Erland Josephson.

Works
Partial list
 Insecta Caffrariae annis 1838–1845 a J.A. Wahlberg collecta. Coleoptera. Holmiae : Fritze & Norstedt Vol. 1 8 + 625 pp.(1851).

1796 births
1868 deaths
Swedish entomologists
Coleopterists
Members of the Royal Swedish Academy of Sciences